Ekaterina Dzhukeva  (born 8 May 1988) is a Bulgarian handballer who plays as a goalkeeper for Liga Națională club SCM Craiova and the  Bulgaria national team.

Achievements
Ekstraklasa:
Winner: 2014, 2015, 2016

References

1988 births
Living people
People from Dupnitsa
Bulgarian female handball players
Bulgarian expatriates in Iceland
Bulgarian expatriate sportspeople in Spain
Bulgarian expatriates in Norway
Bulgarian expatriate sportspeople in Poland
Bulgarian expatriates in Hungary
Bulgarian expatriate sportspeople in Romania
Expatriate handball players
Sportspeople from Kyustendil Province